Savran  is a Hasidic dynasty founded by Rebbe Moshe Zvi Giterman. Savran is a town in present-day Ukraine.

The previous Admor of Savran was Rebbe Yissakhar Dov Hager of Har Nof, Jerusalem (died in 2013). He was a renowned Torah Scholar and served as a Dayan on the Jerusalem Rabbinic Court. He was the son in law of Rabbi Avraham Leib Klein who served as the Mashgiach of the Rizhner Yeshiva in Jerusalem. 

In 2013, he was succeeded by his second eldest son, Rebbe Yitzchak Meir Hager, as Savraner Rebbe. The Rebbe lived few years in Ashdod but used to come to Jerusalem every Shabbat and Yom Tov to conduct prayer services and Tishim in the Beis Medrash of his late father. He often visited throughout the week to deliver Torah classes as well as conduct meeting where he councils individuals. He serves as a Dayan on the Ashdod "HaYashar V'Hatov" Beis Din.

The Savraner Rebbe is currently living in Har Nof, Jerusalem.

Lineage

 Rabbi Moshe Zvi Giterman (1775–1838) 1st Savraner Rebbe and son of Rabbi Shlomo of Savran
 Rabbi Yisroel – son-in-law of Rabbi Moshe Zvi and nephew of the Kozhnitzer Magid
 Rabbi Shlomo Giterman (d-1848) of Chechelnik, son of Rabbi Moshe Zvi
 Rabbi Barukh Giterman of Savran, son of Rabbi Shlomo and son-in-law of Rabbi David Hager of Zablidov (son of Rabbi Menachem Mendel Hager of Kosov (Hasidic dynasty), author of Ahavas Sholom)
 Rabbi Moshe Tzvi Hager Av Beis Din of Satanovich (1830–1896); he adopted the Hager surname from his mother, Rebbetzin Folya Hager, daughter of Rabbi David Hager
 Rabbi Yitzhak Meir Hager of Satanovich (1860–1926), son of Rabbi Moshe Tzvi Hager
 Rabbi Yehuda Zundel Hager of Jerusalem, Savraner Rebbe (1906–1993), son of Rabbi Yitzhak Meir Hager
 Rabbi Yissakhar Dov Hager of Jerusalem, Savraner Rebbe (1939–2013), son of the previous Savraner Rebbe
 Rabbi Yitzhak Meir Hager of Jerusalem, son of Rabbi Yissakhar Dov Hager and current Savraner Rebbe  
 Rabbi Moshe Giterman of Chechelnik (1827–1876), son of Rabbi Shlomo
 Rabbi Shlomo “the Second” Giterman (1858–1919), the son of Rabbi Moshe Giterman of Chechelnik
 Rabbi  Mordekhai Giterman of Chechelnik (d-1946), son of Rabbi Shlomo the second Giterman 
 Rabbi  Barukh Giterman of Chechelnik (d-1950), son of Rabbi Shlomo the second Giterman 
 Rabbi David Giterman of Savran (d-1912), son of Rabbi Shlomo Giterman

Nigun (Hasidic Melodies)

Among other hasidic melodies specific to Savran, Rebbe Moshe Zvi Giterman composed a very inspiring version of "B'nei heicholo" that is traditionally sung at Seudah Shlishit.

Hasidic dynasties
Jewish Ukrainian history